Dorothy Speckard or Speckart or Spekarde (died 1656) was a courtier, milliner, silkwoman, and worker in the wardrobe of Elizabeth I of England, Anne of Denmark, Prince Henry, and Henrietta Maria. Her husband, Abraham Speckard, was an investor in the Somers Isles Company which colonised Bermuda.

Career
Dorothy Speckard was a daughter or relation of William Acton of Worcestershire. She married Abraham Speckard (d. 1642), a gentleman or merchant in London, the couple were wealthy.

Queen Elizabeth
She was ranked as a "Gentlewoman" and participated in gift exchange at Elizabeth's court. At New Year 1599/1600 the Speckards gave Queen Elizabeth a head veil of striped network, flourished with carnation silk and embroidered with metallic "Oes". At the same time, Elizabeth Brydges, a maid of honour presented a doublet of network lawn, cut and tufted up with white knit-work, flourished with silver. In 1605 she gave King James a shirt of fine Holland linen with band and cuffs of cut work. She was also called the queen's "silkewoman", in the king's household she was described as an "artificier", while her husband was the queen's milliner.

She made veils, "tires" and "devices" for the queen and women of the court to wear in their hair, with other accessories including sleeves and ruffs. A particular speciality in the years 1601-1603 were pieces fashioned and woven from hair including; hair-braids, pyramids, globes, loops and tufts, to decorate the queen's wigs.

Customers included Helena, Marchioness of Northampton, and Phillipa Wotton, Lady Bacon for whom she mended a hood.

Anne of Denmark
Anne of Denmark made her a "chamberer" of the bedchamber and a lady of her privy chamber. According to a surviving wardrobe inventory, she received some of the clothes delivered to the queen, and on 30 May 1610 the queen gave her a black satin gown.

As a New Year's day gift in January 1605 she gave King James two handkerchiefs embroidered with Venice gold and a cutwork handkerchief. She supplied Anne of Denmark with £350 of goods while the queen was lying in at Greenwich Palace in 1605, pregnant with Princess Mary. In October 1607 Susan de Vere, Countess of Montgomery, a lady-in-waiting to Anna of Denmark took sick-leave from court. Her uncle Robert Cecil, 1st Earl of Salisbury sent her a present for the queen. She wrote that "Mrs Speckerd" would make it up, as he had instructed, and she would present it to the queen when she was well.

She made costumes for the masque Tethys' Festival in 1610.

In 1615 King James granted the couple rights in the Somerset manors of Norton St Philip and Hinton Charterhouse.

In December 1617 the Venetian ambassador Piero Contarini described the appearance of Anne of Denmark at Somerset House. Her hair was dressed with diamonds and other jewels and extended in rays or like the petals of a sunflower with artificial hair. This may have been provided by Speckard, or the Queen's tire-woman in ordinary, Blanche Swansted. Swanstead was sent to Edinburgh at the Union of Crowns in 1603 to dress Anne of Denmark's hair and remained in her service.

When Anne of Denmark died in 1619 Speckard provided a veil for the funeral effigy, and walked in the procession, listed with the ladies of the Privy Chamber. An inventory was made of the queen's possessions at Somerset House and a red leather case with the queen's embroidered linen waistcoats and silk stockings was noted as "Mrs Speckarts charge", her responsibility.

Abraham Speckard was involved in long-running Chancery case with debtors including Sir John Kennedy, the husband of Elizabeth Brydges. He was an investor in the Somers Isles Company formed to colonise Bermuda.

Later life
She worked as the "queen's starcher" to Henrietta Maria in 1626, and was rewarded with a gift of silver plate.

In 1622 the couple bought land adjacent to the church of St Giles in the Fields in London and built a house. Zachary Bethell, a servant of the queen's wardrobe lived nearby. Abraham Speckard donated a stained-glass window in 1628 depicting "Abraham and Isaac". In 1630 he paid for a new churchyard wall in 1630, in which there was a private door into their garden. In his will, he requested to be buried in the church under his pew, his body to be carried from his lodging "through the back part into the churchyard with decency".

In 1647 she petitioned Parliament on account of her poverty and received a grant of £100, of which she was paid £75 on 16 November 1647.

She died in 1656. The door in the churchyard wall was blocked up in 1670.

External links
 The monument to Dorothy Speckard's cousin Sir Thomas Acton of Sutton at Tenbury Wells, Church Monuments Society, commissioned by Joyce Acton, wife of Sir Thomas Lucy of Charlecote.

References

1656 deaths
Court of James VI and I
British milliners
British hairdressers
16th-century English businesswomen
17th-century English businesswomen
Household of Anne of Denmark
Material culture of royal courts
Silkwomen